Jimmy Carter (born 1924) was the president of the United States from 1977 to 1981.

James, Jim, or Jimmy Carter may also refer to:

Arts and entertainment
 James Carter (engraver) (1798–1855), English engraver
 James A. Carter (1902–?), British art director
 James Carter (singer) (1925–2003), American singer for James Carter and the Prisoners
 Jimmy Carter (singer) (born 1932), American singer for The Blind Boys of Alabama
 Jim Carter (actor) (born 1948), English actor
 James Carter (musician) (born 1969), American jazz saxophonist and flautist
 James L. Carter, American film and television cinematographer

Politics and law
 James G. Carter (1795–1849), American state legislator and education reformer
 James Carter (judge) (1805–1878), British jurist in Canada
 James P. T. Carter (1822–1869), American military officer and politician in Arizona Territory
 James C. Carter (1827–1905), American lawyer
 James Garneth Carter (1877–1949), American diplomat
 James Earl Carter Sr. (1894–1953), American businessman and politician; father of US president Jimmy Carter
 James Marshall Carter (1904–1979), United States federal judge
 J. P. Carter (James Pratt Carter, 1915–2000), American military officer and mayor of Madison, North Carolina
 James H. Carter (1935–2016), justice of the Iowa Supreme Court

Sports 
 James Carter (footballer) (fl. 1900), English footballer
 James Carter (coach) (1911–2012), American basketball coach
 Jimmy Carter (boxer) (1923–1994), American boxer
 Jim Carter (baseball) (1928–2000), American Negro league baseball player
 Jim Carter (American football) (born 1948), American football player
 James Carter (swimmer) (born 1957), British swimmer
 Jim Carter (golfer) (born 1961), American golfer
 James Carter (basketball) (born 1964), Puerto Rican basketball player
 Jimmy Carter (footballer) (born 1965), English footballer
 James Carter (hurdler) (born 1978), American hurdler

Others
 Jim Carter (pseudoscientist), amateur physicist whose theories have been controversial

Other uses
 USS Jimmy Carter, a US Navy submarine

See also

 
 
 
 
 
 
 Jim (disambiguation)
 Jimmy (disambiguation)
 James (disambiguation)
 Carter (disambiguation)